Pleuroploca lyonsi is a species of sea snail, a marine gastropod mollusk in the family Fasciolariidae, the spindle snails, the tulip snails and their allies.

Description
The length attains 140.6 mm

Distribution
This marine species occurs off Madagascar..

References

External links

Fasciolariidae
Gastropods described in 2008